Just a Gigolo is a 1993 British sitcom made by Central for ITV starring Tony Slattery as Nick Brim, a teacher who must become a gigolo to pay for his house.

Other characters include his younger brother Simon (played by Paul Bigley) and Natalie, Nick's love interest, played by Rowena King.

Cast
 Tony Slattery as Nick Brim
 Paul Bigley as Simon Brim
 Rowena King as Natalie
 Susan Denaker as Naomi
 Wanda Ventham as Marge Payne

External links 

 

1993 British television series debuts
1993 British television series endings
1990s British sitcoms
ITV sitcoms
Male prostitution in the arts
Television series by ITV Studios
English-language television shows
Television shows produced by Central Independent Television
Prostitution in British television